Tricholoma moserianum is a European mushroom of the agaric genus Tricholoma. It was formally described in 1989 by Marcel Bon. The specific epithet honours Austrian mycologist Meinhard Moser.

See also
List of Tricholoma species

References

moserianum
Fungi described in 1990
Fungi of Europe